Rio Grande do Sul was a  built for the Brazilian Navy in 1909–10.

Construction and commissioning

Rio Grande do Sul was part of a large 1904 naval building program by Brazil. Also planned as part of this were the two  dreadnoughts, ten  destroyers, three submarines and a submarine tender. With a design that borrowed heavily from the British  scout cruisers, Rio Grande do Suls keel was laid in 1907 in Armstrong Whitworth's Elswick, Newcastle upon Tyne yard. Construction took about a year and a half, and she was launched on 20 April 1909 with Madame A. M. Gomez Ferraz being the sponsor on behalf of Her Excellency Senhora Dr. Carlos Barbosa. As a class, Bahia and Rio Grande do Sul were the fastest cruisers in the world when they were commissioned, and the first in the Brazilian Navy to utilize steam turbines for propulsion.

Gallery

Endnotes

References 

 Moore, John, ed. Jane's Fighting Ships of World War I. London: Random House [Jane's Publishing Company], 2001 [1919]. . .
"Rio Grande do Sul I." Serviço de Documentação da Marinha – Histórico de Navios. Diretoria do Patrimônio Histórico e Documentação da Marinha, Departamento de História Marítima. Accessed 27 January 2015.
 Scheina, Robert L. "Brazil" in Robert Gardiner and Randal Gray, eds. Conway's All the World's Fighting Ships 1906–1921. Annapolis: Naval Institute Press, 1985. . .
 Whitley, M.J. Cruisers of World War Two: An International Encyclopedia. Annapolis: Naval Institute Press, 1995. . .

Bahia-class cruisers
Ships built by Armstrong Whitworth
Ships built on the River Tyne
1909 ships
World War I cruisers of Brazil
World War II cruisers of Brazil